Li Man-gu (born 10 November 1950) is a North Korean sports shooter. He competed in the men's 50 metre running target event at the 1976 Summer Olympics.

References

1950 births
Living people
North Korean male sport shooters
Olympic shooters of North Korea
Shooters at the 1976 Summer Olympics
Place of birth missing (living people)